Vladimir Akopian (born December 7, 1971) is an Armenian-American chess Grandmaster.

Career

Akopian was born in Baku, Azerbaijan Soviet Socialist Republic, Soviet Union. He won the World Under-16 Championship in 1986 at the age of 14 and the World Under-18 Championship at 16. In 1991 he won the World Junior Chess Championship.

He won the Armenian Chess Championship in 1996 and 1997. In 1999 he made his way through to the final of the FIDE knockout World Chess Championship, but lost to Alexander Khalifman by 3.5-2.5. In the 2004 event, he was knocked out in the quarter-finals by the player he had defeated in the 1999 semi-finals, Michael Adams.

At the Russia vs the Rest of the World 2002, Akopian defeated FIDE #1 ranked Garry Kasparov in 25 moves in the final eighth round.

Akopian defeated World Champion Vladimir Kramnik in the first round of the Corus chess tournament 2004 and was in the lead for the beginning of the tournament. He finished the contest in tenth place.

He made it to the quarterfinals in the FIDE World Chess Championship 2004, where he lost to eventual tournament runner-up Michael Adams.

In 2005 he tied for 1st–5th with Emil Sutovsky, Andrei Kharlov, Vassily Ivanchuk and Alexander Motylev at the Aeroflot Open in Moscow. Akopian had a score of 6.5 at the Aeroflot Open 2005 and took part in a five-way tie. After the tiebreaker, he came in fifth.

It was reported that Akopian had to withdraw from the 2005 Dubai Open when he was arrested at Dubai airport having been mistaken for an individual of the same name wanted by Interpol for murder.

Early in 2007, Akopian won the Gibtelecom Masters in Gibraltar with a score of 7.5/9 ahead of a group of players tied at 7/9 including Michael Adams.

Akopian came in third place at the Fourth FIDE Grand Prix in April 2009 with a score of 7.5/13, one point behind compatriot Levon Aronian. He lost to Peter Leko, who had the same score, in a tiebreaker.

In December 2009, he was awarded the title of "Honoured Master of Sport of the Republic of Armenia".

On the May 2013 FIDE list, he has an Elo rating of 2705, making him number 39 in the world and Armenia's number two player, behind Levon Aronian.

In 2021, Akopian switched federations to represent the United States of America.

Team competitions
The Armenia national chess team made its Chess Olympiad debut at the 30th Chess Olympiad in 1992 and won bronze. Akopian played on board two for the Olympiad, behind Rafael Vaganian.

Akopian was one of the contributing players on the Armenian chess team which won gold at the 2006 Chess Olympiad ahead of second placed China and third placed United States. Akopian played on board two for the Olympiad. 

Akopian won the 38th Chess Olympiad in Dresden (2008) with the Armenia national Chess team, winning gold for the second time in a row at a Chess Olympiad. Armenian President Serzh Sargsyan attended the Olympiad to support the team. After the Olympiad, they flew back to Armenia with him on the presidential plane, Air Force Armenia One.

Armenia and Akopian regained their Olympiad title at the 40th Chess Olympiad (2012). This was the third time Armenia won gold at the Olympiad. Akopian played on board two at the previous two and board three for the latest. As the players were awarded their gold medals, the Armenian national anthem Mer Hayrenik was played and the Armenian flag was raised in Istanbul. Levon Aronian was holding an Armenian flag up as he and his team were standing on the first place podium. Upon returning to Yerevan, the players were welcomed back with a ceremony by many people in the city the moment their airplane touched down in Zvartnots Airport.

Akopian revealed after the 40th Olympiad that he is unsure if he will ever compete at the Chess Olympiads again.

He was a member of the gold-medal winning Armenian team at the World Team Chess Championship in 2011. It was the first time that the Armenian team won this tournament. Akopian played on board three.

Notable games
Vladimir Akopian vs Kiril D Georgiev, Ch World FIDE, Las Vegas (USA) 1999, Queen's Indian Defense: Kasparov-Petrosian Variation, Romanishin Attack (E12), 1-0
Junior (Computer) vs Vladimir Akopian, SuperGM 2000, Owen Defense: General (B00), 1/2-1/2
Vladimir Akopian vs Garry Kasparov, Russia vs The Rest of the World 2002, Sicilian Defense: Nyezhmetdinov-Rossolimo Attack (B30), 1-0
Alexey Korotylev vs Vladimir Akopian, Aeroflot Open 2006, Benoni Defense: Classical Variation, General (A70), 0-1

References

External links

 
 
 
 
 
 
 Grandmaster Games Database - Vladimir Akopian at redhotpawn.com
 Akopian 2019 interview at Chessbase.com
Part 2

1971 births
Living people
Chess grandmasters
Armenian chess players
Soviet chess players
Chess players from Baku
World Youth Chess Champions
World Junior Chess Champions
Chess Olympiad competitors